Arthur Bell Hays (September 14, 1882 – October 16, 1944) was an American football, basketball, and baseball coach. He served as the head football coach at Tarleton State University–then known at Tarleton Junior College–from 1915 to 1917 and again in 1919. He later served as the head football coach (1921–1923) and head men's basketball coach (1921–1924) at Simmons College–later known as Hardin–Simmons University.

Hays was a student at Baylor University, where he played on the football team for one season.

Head coaching record

College football

References

External links
 

1882 births
1944 deaths
Basketball coaches from Texas
Baylor Bears football players
Hardin–Simmons Cowboys baseball coaches
Hardin–Simmons Cowboys basketball coaches
Hardin–Simmons Cowboys football coaches
Tarleton State Texans athletic directors
Tarleton State Texans football coaches
Tarleton State Texans men's basketball coaches
People from Gonzales County, Texas
Players of American football from Texas